Spilosoma rubidus is a moth in the family Erebidae. It was described by John Henry Leech in 1890. It is found in China (Beijing, Hubei, Sichuan, Zhejiang, Shaanxi, Hebei, Jiangxi, Fujian, Hunan, Yunnan, Guizhou, Jilin, Shanxi, Henan, Guangxi, Heilongjiang) and Taiwan.

The Global Lepidoptera Names Index considers Spilosoma rubidus to be a synonym for Spilosoma alba. See Spilarctia alba.

References

Moths described in 1890
rubidus